Preethsu Thappenilla  is a 2000 Indian Kannada language romantic comedy film directed by V. S. Reddy and produced by GVG Raju. The film stars  V. Ravichandran, Rachana Banerjee and Nagesh in the leading roles.

The film was a remake of Telugu film Tholi Prema (1998) directed by A. Karunakaran which won the National Film Award for Best Feature Film in Telugu. The film was also remade in Hindi as Mujhe Kucch Kehna Hai. The music was composed and lyrics written by Ravichandran.

Cast 
 V. Ravichandran as Balu
 Rachana Banerjee as Anu
 Suman Nagarkar as priya
 Srinivasa Murthy
 Nagesh
 K. S. Ashwath
 Sadhu Kokila
 Tennis Krishna
 Mandya Ramesh
 Avinash
 Chitra Shenoy
 Bhavyasri Rai
 Bullet Prakash

Soundtrack 
The music was composed and lyrics written by V. Ravichandran. A total of five tracks have been composed for the film and the audio rights brought by Lahari Music.

References

External links 

 Movie preview at Sify
 Movie preview at Online Bangalore

2000 films
2000s Kannada-language films
Indian romantic comedy films
Films scored by V. Ravichandran
Kannada remakes of Telugu films
2000 romantic comedy films